Friedrich Bohl (born March 5, 1945 in Rosdorf, Göttingen) is a former German politician. From 1991 to 1998 he was the chief of the Federal Chancellery and Federal Minister for Special Affairs. He was the member of Fourth Kohl cabinet and Fifth Kohl cabinet. He succeeded Rudolf Seiters on 26 November 1991.

Biography
Bohl was born in Rosdorf on March 5, 1945. He graduated in law at the University of Marburg in 1964. He finished the first and second legal state examination in 1969 and 1972 respectively. He was also a research associate at the Institute for Commercial and Economic Law at the University of Marburg. He started practising as a lawyer from 1972. He was ordered to notary in January 1999. From 1998 to March 31, 2009 Bohl was on the Executive Board of Deutsche Vermögensberatung (DVAG) responsible for the areas of Group Secretariat, public relations, associations and law. Since March 31, 2009 he is Chairman of the Supervisory Board of Deutsche Vermögensberatung (DVAG). He became a member of the CDU's youth union in 1964. From 1978 to 2002 he was the chairman of CDU's Marburg-Biedenkopf district association. He was a member of Bundestag from 1980 to 2002. From 1970 to 1980 he was a member of Hesse Landtag and was the deputy chairman of the place's CDU association from 1978 to 1980. From 25 May to 26 October 1998 he was the head of the Press and Information Office of the Federal Government. After the 1998 election he resigned from the federal government on 26 October 1998. He had also been member of the Konrad Adenauer Foundation and the Bureau of the European Union of Germany. He also served as the first parliamentary secretary of the CDU / CSU parliamentary group. From 26 November 1991 to 26 October 1998 he served as the Federal Minister for Special Tasks and Head of the Federal Chancellery.

He was alleged to have destroyed files related to the party funding scandal during his tenure as the chief of the Federal chancellery. At that time he had taken the political responsibility but denied that he had ordered to destroy the documents. No evidences were found against him in the matter. He has served as the  chairman of the supervisory board of the company Hessian craft AG. He was regarded as one of the closest confidants of then-Chancellor of Germany Helmut Kohl, and the phrase "No Kohl without Bohl" was used in German politics.

In December 2013 he was unanimously elected the chairman of the Joint Board of the Max Planck Institute for Heart and Lung Research and the William G. Kerckhoff Foundation. He has 4 children.

He had once been called the "man with the oil can", the chancellor's "messenger and adviser, servant and executioner", "sort of prime minister" serving Helmut Kohl and "more equal than his cabinet colleagues".

Awards 

 1990: Decoration of Honour for Services to the Republic of Austria
 1997: Great Cross of Merit of the Federal Republic of Germany
 1998: Grand Cross of the Portuguese Order of Merit

See also 
 Fourth Kohl cabinet
 Fifth Kohl cabinet

References

Bibliography 

1945 births
Living people
Christian Democratic Union of Germany politicians
Members of the Bundestag for Hesse
Members of the Bundestag 1998–2002
Members of the Bundestag 1994–1998
Members of the Bundestag 1990–1994
Members of the Bundestag 1987–1990
Members of the Bundestag 1983–1987
Members of the Bundestag 1980–1983
People from Göttingen (district)
Recipients of the Decoration for Services to the Republic of Austria
Commanders Crosses of the Order of Merit of the Federal Republic of Germany
Heads of the German Chancellery